Glucose-6-phosphatase 2 is an enzyme that in humans is encoded by the G6PC2 gene.

Function 

This gene encodes an enzyme belonging to the glucose-6-phosphatase catalytic subunit family. These enzymes are part of a multicomponent integral membrane system that catalyzes the hydrolysis of glucose-6-phosphate, the terminal step in gluconeogenic and glycogenolytic pathways, allowing the release of glucose into the bloodstream. The family member encoded by this gene is found in pancreatic islets and does not exhibit phosphohydrolase activity, but it is a major target of cell-mediated autoimmunity in diabetes. Several alternatively spliced transcript variants of this gene have been described, but their biological validity has not been determined.

References

Further reading